John Tice Dolbin, Jr. (October 12, 1948 – August 1, 2019) was a professional American football wide receiver who played five seasons for the Denver Broncos of the National Football League. He started for the Broncos in Super Bowl XII and played in 62 consecutive games for the Broncos during his five-season tenure with the team. He is considered one of the most successful players that surged from the World Football League. Before his WFL career he played on sandlots for the semi-pro Pottstown Firebirds of the Atlantic Coast Football League and Schuylkill County Coal Crackers of the Seaboard Football League.  National College of Chiropractic graduate and nationally recognized expert on chiropractic and sports.

References

1948 births
2019 deaths
American chiropractors
American football wide receivers
Chicago Fire (WFL) players
Denver Broncos players
Players of American football from Pennsylvania
Sportspeople from Pottsville, Pennsylvania
Wake Forest Demon Deacons football players
Atlantic Coast Football League players